The Greek Amphitheatre is an open-air amphitheater on the campus of Southern Arkansas University (SAU) in Magnolia, Arkansas. Located at the southeastern corner of the campus, it is the only performance space of its kind in southern Arkansas, and has regularly been the site of university events. It was built in 1938 by a combined effort of the National Youth Administration, and New Deal works program, and the 1936 graduating class of Magnolia A & M, as SAU was then called. All of its major elements, including the seating area and stage, are made of concrete.

The amphitheater was listed on the National Register of Historic Places in 2005.

See also
National Register of Historic Places listings in Columbia County, Arkansas

References

Theatres on the National Register of Historic Places in Arkansas
Neoclassical architecture in Arkansas
Theatres completed in 1936
Southern Arkansas University
National Register of Historic Places in Columbia County, Arkansas
National Youth Administration
Amphitheaters on the National Register of Historic Places
New Deal in Arkansas
1936 establishments in Arkansas